Shrikrishan Modi (born 1924) was an Indian politician. He was elected to the Lok Sabha, the lower house of the Parliament of India, from Sikar in Rajasthan, as a member of the Indian National Congress.

References

External links
Official biographical sketch in Parliament of India website

1924 births
Possibly living people
India MPs 1971–1977
Lok Sabha members from Rajasthan
Indian National Congress politicians